HD 86267, also known as HR 3932, is a solitary orange-hued star located in the southern constellation Antlia. It has an apparent magnitude of 5.82, allowing it to be faintly seen with the naked eye.

HD 86267 has a stellar classification of K1 III, indicating that it is a red giant. At present it has 1.73 times the mass of the Sun but has expanded to 19.7 times its girth. It is a member of the old disk population, having a metallicity 71% that of the Sun. The value means that it is metal deficient. Its current rotation rate is too low to be measured accurately.

References

K-type giants
Antlia
086267
CD-32 06895
48748
3932
Antliae, 36